Pounder is an EP from Nuclear Assault, released on June 1, 2015. It is the band's first EP since 1988's Good Times, Bad Times, and their first studio recording since 2005's Third World Genocide. This was also their final work as a band to include new material before Nuclear Assault disbanded again in 2022.

Track listing

Personnel

Nuclear Assault
 John Connelly – vocals, rhythm guitar
 Erik Burke – lead guitar
 Dan Lilker – bass
 Glenn Evans – drums

Technical personnel
 Robert Blackburn – engineering
 Thomas Johansson – mastering

References

Nuclear Assault albums
2015 EPs